Randolph Lycett (27 August 1886 – 9 February 1935) was a British tennis player. Lycett is primarily known for his success in doubles, winning 5 men's doubles and 3 mixed doubles slams. He was also the runner-up at the 1922 Wimbledon men's singles (where he lost to Gerald Patterson).

Lycett was recognised as one of the dominant players in men's doubles. He was the champion at both the Australasian Championships and Wimbledon multiple times. In April 1924 he won the singles title at the inaugural British Hard Court Championships in Torquay defeating Christiaan van Lennep in the final in four sets. He played in three ties for the British Davis Cup team in 1921 and 1923 and compiled a record of six wins and three losses.

His cousin was the operatic soprano Miriam Licette.

In the 1921 Wimbledon Quarter Final, Randolph Lycett played Zenzo Shimizu on a very hot day. During the third set, Lycett was revived with gin each time Ends were changed. In the Fifth Set, he ordered a bottle of champagne, and was drinking it when the Umpire announced "Shimizu leads by nine games to eight in the Final Set". Lycett dropped his racket, and began to search for it on his hands and knees.

Grand Slam finals

Singles: 1 runner-up

Doubles: 6 (5 titles, 1 runner-up)

Mixed doubles: 5 (3 titles, 2 runners-up)

References

External links
 
 
 

Australasian Championships (tennis) champions
English male tennis players
Sportspeople from Birmingham, West Midlands
Wimbledon champions (pre-Open Era)
1886 births
1935 deaths
Grand Slam (tennis) champions in mixed doubles
Grand Slam (tennis) champions in men's doubles
British male tennis players
Tennis people from the West Midlands (county)